Radek Dlouhý (born 13 January 1982, in Prague) is a Czech professional ice hockey player who currently plays with HC Kometa Brno in the Czech Extraliga.

Dlouhý previously played for HC Slavia Praha, KLH Chomutov, HC Rebel Havlíčkův Brod and SK Kadaň.

References

External links 
 

Living people
1982 births
Czech ice hockey forwards
HC Kometa Brno players
HC Slavia Praha players
Neuchâtel Young Sprinters HC players
Ice hockey people from Prague
Sportovní Klub Kadaň players
BK Havlíčkův Brod players
HC Olomouc players
HC Karlovy Vary players
MHC Martin players
HK Dukla Trenčín players
Czech expatriate ice hockey players in Switzerland
Czech expatriate ice hockey players in Slovakia
Piráti Chomutov players